McClintock is a surname of Scottish and Irish Gaelic origin deriving from an anglicization of a Gaelic name variously recorded as  M'Ilandick, M'Illandag, M'Illandick, M'Lentick,  McGellentak, Macilluntud,  McClintoun, and Mac Illiuntaig from the 14th century onward. The name is found mostly in County Donegal. The surname "McClinton" is an anglicization of the same Gaelic name. 
Notable people with the surname include:

 Anne McClintock (born 1954), feminist scholar in Zimbabwe
 Barbara McClintock (1902-1992), American scientist who won the Nobel Prize for Medicine
 Barbara McClintock (illustrator) (born 1955), American artist
 Byron McClintock (born 1930), American Abstract Expressionist artist
 Charles B. McClintock (1886–1965), American politician from Ohio
 Cynthia McClintock (born 1945), prominent American scholar of Latin America and professor of political science and international affairs
 Dan McClintock (born 1977), American professional basketball player
 David McClintock (1913–2001), English natural historian, botanist, horticulturist and author
 Eddie McClintock (born 1967), American actor
 Elizabeth McClintock (1912-2004), American botanist
 Emory McClintock (1840–1916), American actuary
 Francis Leopold McClintock (1819–1907), Irish explorer
 Frank McLintock (born 1939), Scottish footballer
 Frank A. McClintock (1921–2011), Professor of Mechanical Engineering, MIT
 Harry McClintock (1882–1957), American musical composer
 Herbert McClintock (1906–1985), Australian social realist artist
 James H. McClintock (1864–1934), American author
 Jessica McClintock (born 1930), American clothing designer
 John McClintock (disambiguation)
 Jonas R. McClintock (1808–1879), American politician
 Kenneth McClintock (born 1957), Puerto Rican politician
 Martha McClintock (born 1947), American psychologist
 Norah McClintock (born c. 1965), Canadian author
 Peter V. E. McClintock (born 1940), British physicist
 Poley McClintock (1900–1980), American musician
 Rembrandt McClintock (born c. 1900), Australian lithographer
 Ronald McClintock (1892-1922), British World War I flying ace
 Steven McClintock (born 1953), American musician
 Tom McClintock (born 1956), American politician (California)
 William C. McClintock (1845–?), American newspaper publisher

See also
McClinton

Scottish surnames